Teng Li-Chun (29 January 1953 – 8 May 1995), commonly known as Teresa Teng, was a Taiwanese singer, actress, musician and philanthropist. Referred to by some as the "Eternal Queen of Asian Pop," she is considered one of the greatest and most influential figures in Asian pop music. She is recognized as a cultural icon for her contributions to Chinese pop, giving birth to the phrase, "Wherever there are Chinese-speaking people, there is the music of Teresa Teng." 

With a career spanning almost 30 years, Teng established herself as a dominant and influential force in Asia throughout most of her career, including East Asia, Southeast Asia, and, to some extent, South Asia. She is credited as Asia's first musical superstar and by some as the pioneer of contemporary Chinese pop music—a major force in the development of the Chinese music industry by incorporating western and eastern styles into her music, replacing the most revolutionary songs then prevalent in mainland China and laying the foundation for modern Chinese popular music. Besides, Teng was also instrumental in bridging the cultural gap across Chinese-speaking nations and was one of the first artists to connect Japan to some of East and Southeast Asia by singing Japanese pop songs. In Taiwan, she was famous for entertaining the armed forces and singing patriotic songs that appealed to the natives of the island. Her performances at large-scale venues in the country helped establish the nation’s concert industry. She was nicknamed "the patriotic entertainer" and "the soldiers' sweetheart." 

She recorded more than 1,700 songs throughout her career, starting when she was 14 years old, not only in Mandarin, but also in Hokkien, Cantonese, Shanghainese, Japanese, Indonesian, English, and Italian. To date, her songs have been covered by hundreds of artists all over the world.

According to available IFPI statistics, Teng has sold over 48 million albums as of 2010 (excluding mainland China). In 1986, Time named her one of the seven greatest female singers in the world. In 2009, in a poll by a Chinese government web portal, Teng was selected as the "most influential cultural figure in China since 1949" by 8.5 million netizens. In 2010, on the eve of "March 8th International Women's Day," she was voted "the most influential woman in modern China" by the Chinese media and radio stations in and outside the country. Teng was inducted into the "Popular Music Hall of Fame" at the Koga Masao Music Museum in Japan in 2007, making her the only non-Japanese national to do so.

Early life

Teng was born to Waishengren parents in Baozhong Township, Yunlin County, Taiwan on January 29, 1953. Her father was a soldier in the Republic of China Armed Forces from Daming, Hebei, and her mother was from Dongping, Shandong—who fled to Taiwan after communists took over the mainland in 1949.

The only daughter among five children, Teng was raised in a poverty-stricken family and spent her early childhood in military dependents' villages, first in Yunlin and then in Pingtung. Her father retired in 1957, and then worked selling cakes to make ends meet. She received her early education at Luzhou Elementary School in the Luzhou District, Taipei County, Taiwan.

Teng was exposed to music at an early age through her music-loving parents. Her father was a Peking opera enthusiast, and her mother appreciated Huangmei opera, often accompanying her daughter to Chinese movie theatres and opera houses. At the age of six, she began her voice lessons through an acquaintance of her father’s, who instructed an air force band. Considering the martial environment of 1950s Taiwan, her first mentor introduced her to singing before military audiences, a practice she continued throughout her life. Her first major prize was in 1964, when she sang "Visiting Yingtai" from Shaw Brothers' Huangmei opera movie, The Love Eterne, at an event hosted by the Broadcasting Corporation of China. Following year, she went to attend Ginling Girls' High School in Sanchong Township, Taipei County to further her studies. However, due to conflict between her performances and studies, she dropped out of school in the second year and pursued her career as a singer professionally. She was soon able to support her family with her singing.

Career

Early beginnings and overseas tour 

Teng's career commenced in 1967 as a host of the television show One Star a Day, which aired for 20 minutes from Tuesday to Sunday. She then appeared in television dramas and movies, including a leading role in the 1967 film Thank You, Manager. At the age of 14, Teng withdrew from school to focus on music. She signed with a local company, Yeu Jow Records, and began to release a series of long-playing albums of "a go-go" dance tunes and cover versions of western pop songs as well as local Taiwanese, Chinese, and Southeast Asian folk tunes. However, due to the lack of extra copyright royalties to increase her income, she committed to singing in night clubs around Taiwan. She debuted at Paris Night, an upscale Taipei nightclub, and set a record for performing onstage there for 70 consecutive days, giving a 90-minute performance every single day. Her albums sold well, and soon she got an opportunity to record a theme song for Jingjing, Taiwan's first televised series and did a promotional tour that attracted quite a bit of attention in the media. Her first taste of fame came in 1968, when performance on the popular Taiwanese music program The Gathering of Stars led to a record contract. She released several albums within the next few years under the Life Records label in Hong Kong. During these years, she recorded several top hits, such as "Remembering Mama" and "The Moment I See You, I Smile". She held concerts in Southeast Asia, drawing big crowds throughout the region. Soon, her earnings from performing and recording afforded her family a comfortable life; they moved from Luzhou District to Beitou District, Taipei, where they bought a home.

By the 1970s, her music style had changed; she fused pop and opera styles and incorporated western jazz in order to further expand her market. Her popularity boomed in Asia after she released several albums in multiple languages. In April 1979, she held her first concert in Vancouver, Canada. On her next trip, she toured major US cities such as San Francisco and Los Angeles. In 1980, she was invited to perform at Lincoln Center in New York and the Los Angeles Music Center in California, becoming the first singer of Chinese descent to make a headline there. Upon her return to Taiwan, Teng went on a Southeast Asian tour in 1981, drawing 35,000 attendees in Malaysia. She continued to hold large-scale concerts in Hong Kong and the Southeast Asian region almost every year. In 1983, she performed a series of concerts at The Colosseum at Caesars Palace in Las Vegas. They met with tremendous success. Teng gave many free concerts throughout most of her career to help the less fortunate or raise funds for charities. The funds collected from her concerts were donated to public welfare.

Musical move in China 
For most of the previous three decades, China was both economically and culturally closed to the rest of the world. Her songs began to trickle into mainland China around 1974 with the availability of radios. In 1977, her song "The Moon Represents My Heart" became one of the earliest foreign songs to arrive in the mainland. In 1978, with economic reform and the opening of borders, cassette recorders and pirated recordings of her songs began to flow from coastal cities to the rest of the country. Her popularity soon skyrocketed. In Taiwan, her songs became a propaganda tool for the KMT's psychological war against the Chinese Communist Party. Teng's songs were blasted from the sea-facing speakers from Kinmen Island to the residents of mainland China at a much higher volume. This propaganda practise continued throughout the 1980s. In the early 1980s, continuing political tension between mainland China and Taiwan led to her music, along with that of other singers from Taiwan and Hong Kong, being banned for some years in mainland China, describing it as too "bourgeois" and "corrupt" by Chinese authorities. In spite of the ban, Teng's songs defied the censorship and penetrated China's iron curtain. Her songs continued to be played everywhere, from nightclubs to government buildings, and the ban was soon lifted. Teng became almost as well known in mainland China as the country's leader. Her fans nicknamed her "Little Deng" because she had the same family name as Deng Xiaoping; there was a saying that, by day, everyone listened to "old Deng" because they had to. At night, everyone listened to "Little Teng" because they wanted to. Shanghai Party Newspaper, "Wen Hui Bao," remarked, fearing that her songs may erode the revolutionary spirit of the (Communist) Chinese. Faced with this solid wall of popularity, China ceased its restrictions on her music from the mid-1980s onward.

Light Exquisite Feeling and political outlook 

Teng's contract with Polydor ended in 1981, and she signed a contract with Taurus Records in 1983 and made a successful comeback appearance in Japan. In 1983, Teng released her most critically acclaimed album, Dandan youqing, translated as Light Exquisite Feeling, which sets 12 poems from the Tang and Song dynasties into music, blending modern and traditional styles. It became Teng's first album to include entirely new songs, without any covers. The most popular single from the album is "Wishing We Last Forever". Teng apparently felt a deep attachment to the mainland, as she immersed herself in the classics of the Tang and Song periods. In a television special, she spoke of her desire to contribute to the transmission of "Chinese" culture. Dressed in her period clothing, she commented:I have one small wish. I hope everyone will like these songs so that the flourishing begonias within China's 10 million square kilometres and the treasures of this 5000-year old culture can be handed down generation through song. And through this, I hope our posterity will never forget the happiness, sadness, and glory of being a "Chinese" person.

The album received a positive response from both the public and critics, commending her outstanding interpretation of the ancient poems and successfully projecting classical Chinese literature into a contemporary popular music style. It was well accepted in Southeast Asia and went gold on the first day of its release in Hong Kong. Yang Yanxing, a professor at Tianjin Conservatory of Music, greatly praised the album, describing it as "the finest work of the Chinese music circle". In March 2012, Pu Xiqian from the China News Service called the album a "perfect combination of poems and music". Later, Teng started working on completing a sequel to the album. However, due to changes in the surroundings of music, as well as her deteriorating health and other reasons, she failed to realise her wish.

In 1987, Teng released the Mandarin version of the album I Only Care About You. After that, owing to her health issues, she basically stopped participating in commercial activities and gradually entered a semi-retired state.

Teng performed in Paris during the 1989 Tiananmen student protests on behalf of the students and expressed her support. On May 27, 1989, over 300,000 people attended the Concert for Democracy in China at the Happy Valley Racecourse in Hong Kong. One of the highlights was her rendition of "My Home Is on the Other Side of the Mountain".

Though Teng performed in many countries around the world, she never performed in mainland China. During her 1980 TTV concert, when asked about such a possibility, she responded by stating that the day she performs on the mainland will be the day the Three Principles of the People are implemented there—in reference to either the pursuit of Chinese democracy or reunification under the banner of the ROC.

Career in Hong Kong 
 
In 1975, Teng collaborated with Polygram Records of Hong Kong. Her album Island Love Songs: Goodbye My Love (1975) won her the Ten-Star Prize and the opportunity to star in a movie musical of her own. The album was awarded platinum at Hong Kong's first Golden Album Awards. In 1976, Teng held her first Hong Kong concert at Lee Theatre, which was a tremendous success. She continued performing in concerts for the next 5 years, attracting big crowds throughout this time. In 1978, her albums Teresa Teng's Greatest Hits and Love Songs of the Island 3 won her second Golden Album Award. She released her first Cantonese album, Sai Bat Leung Laap, (勢不兩立) in 1980, which became the best-seller of the year; its single, "Forget Him", became one of the most famous Cantonese pop songs at that time. The album received platinum at the Golden Album Awards. In 1982, her dual-album of Teresa Teng's Concert Live became another platinum after hitting the market. She became a household name in Hong Kong and held a concert at Queen Elizabeth Stadium the same year. Her second album, Maan bou jan saang lou (漫步人生路), released in 1983, achieved even greater success than her predecessor. It became her fifth consecutive album to be awarded platinum, a record-breaking win against all singers in Hong Kong. Her popularity reached its peak by the end of 1983 with six straight sold-out concerts at the Hong Kong Coliseum. These concerts broke all sorts of Hong Kong records and played to a combined total audience of about 100,000 people. The concert, named A Billion Applause Concert, was performed in both Taiwan and Hong Kong from December 29, 1983, to January 3, 1984, in honor of her 15th year as a performer. One year later, she was awarded a special medal by PolyGram Hong Kong as a tribute to her success for having sold more than 5 million copies in Hong Kong.

Career in Japan 

Teng entered the Japanese market in 1973. On March 1, 1974, Teng released her first Japanese single "No Matter Tonight or Tomorrow", which marked the beginning of her career in Japan. The single initially received a lukewarm market response and was ranked 75th on the Oricon Chart with sales of approximately 30,000. The Watanabe firm considered giving up using her name. However, considering her success in Asia, the record company decided to release two or three consecutive singles to test the market further. On July 1, 1974, Teng's second single "Airport" was released. The sales of 'Airport' were huge, totaling 700,000 copies. She then released a number of successful singles including "The Night Ferry" and "Goodbye, My Love". In 1979, she was caught with a fake Indonesian passport while entering Japan and was deported and banned from entering the country for one year.

After a long absence, Teng returned to the Japanese market on September 21, 1983, and released her first single "Tsugunai" (Atonement) after her comeback on 21 January 1984. The single didn't receive good response initially; however, after a month, sales started to pick up, and seven months later, "Tsugunai" eventually ranked 8th on the Oricon Chart and 1st on Japan Cable Broadcasting Chart. By the end of the year, sales surpassed 700,000 copies and final sales reached a million copies. Teng won the top award of 'Singer of the year' from Japan Cable Award. "Tsugunai" won the most popular song category and stayed on the Oricon Chart for nearly a year. The success broke all the sales records of her previous period (1974–1979). On February 21, 1985, her next single, "Aijin"  (Lover) topped the Oricon Chart and Japan cable broadcasting request chart in the first week of its release. The song remained #1 for fourteen consecutive weeks and sales broke the 1.5 million mark. With "Aijin" Teng won the 'Singer of the year' for the second time. Moreover, she was invited to perform in Kouhaku Uta Gassen, which represented the highest honor in the Japanese music world. Her next single "Toki no Nagare ni Mi o Makase" was released on 21 February 1986. The single topped both the Oricon and Japan Cable Broadcasting Chart and sales of the single reached 2.5 million in Asian market becoming one of the most popular singles in Japan that year. She won the Japan Cable Award for the third time in a row. Teng was invited to perform in Kouhaku Uta Gassen for the second time. She became the first-ever artist to achieve three consecutive wins of this Grand Prix, also known as Japan Cable Award.  Teng also remains the only foreign singer to win this award for three consecutive years in the history of Japanese music (1984–1986). Teng gave her last solo concert at the NHK Hall in Tokyo in 1985 before semi-retiring from entertainment circle.

As a military singer in Taiwan 
 
One of Taiwan's most famous cultural exports, Teng was born to a military family in 1953, her father served as a member of the Republic of China Armed Forces during World War 2. After the regime collapsed on the mainland, the Nationalist government switched to Taiwan as their base after 1949. As a child, Teng grew up in this martial environment of the 1950s. Her first mentor introduced her to singing before military audiences, a practice she continued throughout her life. In those years, she gave many performances for soldiers and sang patriotic songs on television programs. In February 1979, while attempting to enter Japan, she was caught using a fake Indonesian passport she bought on the black market. The incident was criticised both in Taiwan and Japan. She was barred for one year from entering the country by Japan's Minister of Justice. In 1980, a year after the incident, she was allowed to return to Taiwan on condition of cooperation with the Taiwanese government. She performed for the Taiwanese troops again, and the income from her performances was donated to the "Funds for Self-Improvement and Patriotism." In August 1981, she performed for the troops for one month, touring military sites all over Taiwan. She visited the generals of the army, navy, and air force and sang for them. These performances were broadcast on TTV’s special program named "Teresa Teng on the Frontline." Due to her vigorous devotion to soldiers in Taiwan, she was awarded the "Patriotic Entertainer" medal by the government information office. These frequent performances for the troops garnered her the nickname "the soldiers’ sweetheart" by the media. In 1988, the death of President Chiang Ching-kuo marked the end of martial rule in Taiwan. In the early 1990s, Teng returned to entertain the troops again, with her last performance being in 1994.

Philanthropic causes 
 
Teng began charity performances at a very young age. One of her first performances came on August 17, 1968, when she sang at the charity fair in Zhongshan Hall in Taipei, for the relief of the earthquake in the Philippines. The charity sale was donated on the spot. She was invited next year by the wife of the then-President of Singapore Yusof Ishak to a charity performance at the Singapore national opera house. In the same year, she performed at the Ten-Star Charity Performance, held by the Singaporean authorities. In 1971, she became the youngest person ever to be awarded the title of the "Charity Queen" of Hong Kong's Bai Hua You Arts Auction for making charity sales. On June 8, 1973, she participated in the "Far East Top Ten Stars Charity Gala" in Singapore, gave 4 performances, and raised $400,000 to be used as scholarships for students in need. Teng continued performing for philanthropic causes throughout the 1970s in Singapore, Taiwan, and Hong Kong. In 1980, she raised over US$1 million for Yan Chai Hospital in Hong Kong and donated the proceeds of her show in Taiwan to that country's national trust fund. In January 1982, Teng held a concert at the Queen Elizabeth Stadium in Hong Kong, and the first proceeds were used for charitable donations; in August, she donated NT$160,000 to build a water tower in a village in northern Thailand and introduce a drinking water system. In 1985, Teng held a solo concert at the NHK Hall in Tokyo, Japan, proceeds of which were donated to charity. She made a special trip to Hong Kong in July 1991 to participate in the disaster relief program of ATV's "Love for East China" as a special charity performance guest to raise funds. Teng gave her last performance in 1994 in Taiwan, one year before her unexpected passing away.

Artistry

Influences 
Teng credits Chinese folk songs and music as a major influence on her musical career, which she often grew up listening to.

As a young child, Teng was exposed to music by her music-loving parents. She learned peking opera through her father, while her mother introduced her to huangmei opera, accompanying her to opera houses and encouraging Teng to sing in that style by purchasing songbooks for her. Alongside regional and folk styles, Teng was also influenced by shidaiqu and the Japanese music.

Singing 
Teng was a soprano, according to The New York Times. She was known for her "soothing and crystalline" singing voice, with her vocal trademark classified as a "quasi-whisper," which David B. Gordon characterises as a "private emotion" in her listeners—as though she were singing for each of them individually. Cultural critic Rey Chow labelled her voice as soft, throaty, and feminine, whereas Mike Levin of Billboard described it as "soft and almost breathless." Teng's voice covered a diverse range of musical styles and languages. Meredith Schweig at Emory University noted this point on her book: "Teng was famously versatile: she confidently performed in multiple languages and grooved in a number of genres, such as Haipai, Enka, and Euro-American pop stylings, on dozens of hit records, and that her voice and physical appearance were revered as the apotheosis of feminine beauty and virtue."

Lyrical writing 
In 1987, Teng recorded the song "Summer Christmas," a cover of the Japanese song "Merry X’mas in Summer," originally recorded by Kuwata Band member Yoshisuke Kuwata. The same year, Teng recorded "River of Destiny," a cover of the Japanese original "Sadame Gawa." Teng composed the lyrics of both songs in Mandarin and included them in her 1987 Mandarin album, "I Only Care About You." In 1988, she wrote the lyrics for the song "We Are the Stars" in both Chinese and Japanese versions and sang it on stage with Japanese musician Yūzō Kayama on October 29. In 1992, Teng penned the lyrics for what was later revised into a song, "Star’s Wish," after she died.

Death and commemorations

On May 8, 1995, Teng unexpectedly died while on vacation in Chiang Mai, Thailand, at the age of 42. Several sources reported a severe asthma attack as the cause of her death; Thai doctors, however, attributed her death to heart failure, but no autopsy was performed. Teng complained of having respiratory difficulties since the beginning of the year. According to some witnesses, she was accompanied by her French friend Paul Quilery, who was off the scene when the attack occurred and had a rather indifferent attitude towards her sudden death. The death was never confirmed as both Teng and Quilery's families declined to allow an autopsy. Later, the case was closed by the police due to a lack of evidence.

Teng's death produced a unified sense of loss throughout all of Asia, according to Billboard. Her funeral in Taiwan became the largest state-sponsored funeral in the country's history, second only to that of ROC leader Chiang Kai-shek. Over 200,000 people lined up outside the funeral home, waiting to give the last farewell to the singer. Her funeral was broadcast on television stations across many Asian countries, while radio stations in Taiwan, China, and Hong Kong devoted their entire programming schedules to her music for two days. Teng was given state honors at her funeral, with Taiwan's flag draped around her coffin. Hundreds of high-ranking officials and dignitaries, including commanders from three branches of the military, attended the funeral and carried her coffin to her grave. A day of national mourning was declared and president Lee Teng-hui was among the thousands in attendance. Teng was posthumously awarded the Ministry of Defense's highest honor for civilians, the KMT's "Hua-hsia Grade One Medal," the Overseas Chinese Affairs' Commission's "Hua Guang Grade One Medal," and the president's commendation. She was buried in a mountainside tomb at Chin Pao San, a cemetery in Jinshan, New Taipei City (then Taipei County) overlooking the north coast of Taiwan.

According to her maiden name character, Yun, the grave was named "Yun Yuan". The gravesite features Teng's golden colored, life-size statue and a large electronic piano keyboard set in the ground that can be played by visitors who step on the keys. On the tombstone, the head of Teresa Teng is carved. The coffin lid behind the tombstone is polished with black marble. Behind the coffin lid is a stone sculpture. The upper half is a lying portrait of the singer, and the right side of the lower half is inlaid with a color photo of her, with the words "Deng Lijun, 1953-1995" written on the left side. On the right side of the coffin lid, there is a huge stone with the words "Yunyuan" inscribed by James Soong, chairman of the People First Party. On the left side of the coffin lid, there is a stone stele on which is engraved with the epitaph: "Here lies a superstar who dedicated her life to singing." The memorial is often visited by her fans.

In May 1995, Shanghai Radio host Dalù dedicated the Sunday morning broadcast to the Taiwanese singer, who died a few days earlier. Spreading her songs was banned in mainland China and the journalist was formally warned for this act.

In 1995, a tribute album, A Tribute to Teresa Teng, was released, which contained covers of Teng's songs by prominent Chinese rock bands.

In May 2002, a wax figure of Teng was unveiled at Madame Tussauds Hong Kong. A house she bought in 1986 in Hong Kong at No. 18 Carmel Street, Stanley also became a popular fan site soon after her death. Plans to sell the home to finance a museum in Shanghai were made known in 2002, and it was subsequently sold for HK $32 million. It closed on what would have been her 51st birthday on January 29, 2004.

Legacy

Throughout her 30-year career and up to this point, Teng has been acknowledged by many as one of the most celebrated and influential figures in Asian music and popular culture, considering her deep impact on the whole of Chinese society, with an influence extending beyond music to include both political and cultural spheres, while her Asia-wide reach is largely attributed to her multi-lingual abilities, which established her as an icon in all of Asia, heralding the era of region-wide pop superstardom that has become today's norm.

Cultural impact 

Teng was considered to be one of the biggest singers in the world in her heyday of the 1970s and 1980s, with a wide repertoire of multilingual songs. She is credited by some as an enlightener and a pioneer of Chinese vocal performance art and modern popular music. Her profound influence on Asian popular music and the Chinese cultural sphere throughout the latter half of the 20th century and thereafter led her to be recognized as Asia's first musical superstar.

Numerous musical and non-musical figures have cited Teng as an idol and a major influence on their work. These include singer Faye Wong, Jay Chou, Jane Zhang, Kazukiyo Nishikiori of Japanese pop group Shonentai, Tetsuya Murakami of The Gospellers, Junko Akimoto, Rimi Natsukawa, "father" of Chinese rock Cui Jian, Romanian singer Cristina Boboacă, fashion designer Vivienne Tam, Nobel Prize laureate and writer Liu Xiaobo, poet and writer Xu Pei, manga artist Kenshi Hirokane, filmmaker Jia Zhangke, as well as painter and sculptor Jian Guo, among others.

China (PRC) 

Prior to the 1980s, foreign music and art were prohibited in mainland China for most of three decades, and love songs were almost non-existent, aside from political and red songs, which heavily dominated the country's cultural domain. They were commonly revolutionary model operas promoting the ideals of the party and military. Jin Zhaojun, a prominent Chinese music critic, characterised the music during this period as "overly masculine and lacking in femininity," in which people were denied a whole range of basic human emotions and modes of expression. Teng's music, in this regard, broke new ground in terms of style and content. She blended traditional Chinese folk music with Western pop and jazz, opening the doors to the musical creations of later generations. Musicians began to study the new forms of music that entered the mainland through foreign cassettes and tape recorders, such as orchestration and singing style. She became the earliest guide for composers on how to arrange music for popular songs, and numerous musicians reproduced their work by imitating her. An important piece of testimony to this is the use of saxophone introduced by Teng. Her frequent use of jazz or jazz-influenced ensembles in her music set the standard for saxophone performance practice in mainland pop today. Another aspect of Teng's influence was the establishment of a "breath singing method". Jin pointed out that, before this, alongside more authentic folk singing, the Chinese also had a "national singing" between bel canto and folk singing. Teng taught that people could also sing with another part of their voice, which was later named "popular singing". 

Teng's songs were focused on a wide range of issues, most primarily love and human relations—the most lacking elements in mainland culture at the time. By the early 1970s, as rates of radio ownership began to increase, especially of cheap and portable transistor models, listening to Teng's music became the primary attraction. Author Ah Cheng recalled hearing her music for the first time in 1975 as a sort of excitement and extreme addiction that he and his friends would press their ears to the wooden frame of a shortwave radio only to get her voice heard. His account of his internal exile in the mountains of Yunnan is better representative of this phenomenon:Yunnan was endowed with a magnificent geographical gift: you could hardly hear central people's radio, and the newspaper would take days to make its way into the mountains and then be collected at the party's secretary's house, where you could ask him to tear off a strip when you wanted to roll up a cigarette. For people who listen to enemy radio, radio from the center or the official newspaper was merely a supplemental reference. But listening to enemy radio was not about political news so much as entertainment. I remember that whenever the Australian national station broadcast a radio play of the Taiwanese film The Story of a Small Town everyone would bring their own radio because the shortwave signal would tend to drift and that way we could cover the entire frequency range and make sure we had continuous sound from at least one receiver at a time. The boys and girls sitting around that grass hut would be in tears! Especially when Teresa Teng's voice rang out, emotions would rise to a fever pitch – her voice was to die for.In 1977, Teng's popular love song "The Moon Represents My Heart" was released; it became one of the first foreign songs to break into the country. Teng's songs over the following decade revolutionized Chinese popular culture, which marked the end of the extremely tight control exercised in the preceding three decades by the communist party over Chinese society and culture.

Author Ah Cheng cited Teng's songs, an inspiration for the revival of popular culture on the mainland.  Wu'erkaixi, a Chinese political commentator of Uyghur heritage, asserted that the youngsters who listened to her songs discovered the desire for the pursuit of freedom through her singing voice. He adds that "to the Chinese, Deng Lijun was a great person." "If Deng Xiaoping brought economic freedom to China, she brought liberation of the body and free thinking to China."

According to Nobel Peace Prize laureate and writer Liu Xiaobo, "Teng's romantic songs reawakened our soft centers by dismantling the cast-iron frame work of our "revolutionary wills", melting our cold, unfeeling hearts, and liberating our long-suppressed human softness and tenderness." Filmmaker Jia Zhangke said that Teng's songs were a big inspiration that drove his curiosity towards cinema. He relates: "Her songs represented a massive transformation in the cultural landscape of China at that time. Prior to the 1980s, China had no popular culture to speak of. The closest thing we had were revolutionary model operas and things made in that mould. All of the stuff around us was structured collectively, but Teng's songs, on the other hand, were entirely new at the time... they evoked individualism, changing everything." Regarding her contribution to the development of the music industry in China, Wang Xiaofeng at Sanlian Life Weekly wrote, "Teng not only pioneered the development of popular music but also stimulated the rapid development of audio-video companies at that time." He stated that listening to tapes was one of the main cultural activities and that they were luxury goods, but this did not stop ordinary people from consuming them. In 1979, there were only a few audio-video distribution companies in the Mainland. By 1982, it had increased to 300, indicating Teng's music as the trailblazer for this change.

Beyond the China Region 

Teng became popular in Japan and Southeast Asia, and to some extent, South Asia, achieving a "cult status" in Hong Kong, Taiwan, Mainland China, and Japan, where she became a "barometer of cross-strait relations" in rising geopolitical tensions at the time, and one of the first artists to break through linguistic and cultural barriers, earning acceptance and acclaim from cultures across much of the region that had previously been confined to national boundaries. Her songs have been covered by several hundreds of singers all over the world; by artists like Faye Wong, Leslie Cheung, Jon Bon Jovi, Siti Nurhaliza, Shila Amzah, Katherine Jenkins, Im Yoon-ah, David Archuleta, Agnez Mo, Greek singer Nana Mouskouri,  English vocal group Libera, Jewish singer Noa, Grammy Award-winning American musician Kenny G, Kiwi pianist Carl Doy, Cuba's leading a cappella musical band Vocal Sampling, among others. Her songs are also featured in various international films, such as Rush Hour 2, The Game, Prison On Fire, Year of the Dragon, Formosa Betrayed, Gomorrah, and Crazy Rich Asians.

In 1974, Teng entered the Japanese market, two years after Japan severed diplomatic ties with Taiwan. She was extremely popular in Japan throughout the 1970s and 1980s, having lived off her royalties in the country after semi-retiring in the late '80s. During this tenure, Teng recorded and performed Japanese pop songs, often termed as kayokyoku by Japanese media, and helped connect Japan to much of East Asia, particularly Taiwan, China, and some of Southeast Asia, helping bridge the gap between them, some of which were later covered in Mandarin, as reported by Nippon and Billboard.

Hirano Kumiko, an author at Nippon writes:For Japanese, Teresa Teng was more than just a popular singer. By performing kayōkyoku, she connected Japan to its Asian neighbors. She taught us about the profundity of Chinese culture, whether in her birthplace of Taiwan, her ancestral home of China, or Hong Kong, which she loved throughout her life. We, her Japanese fans, will never forget her velvety voice and the brief, beautiful radiance of her life.

In 2007, she was inducted into the "Popular Music Hall of Fame" at the Koga Masao Music Museum in Japan, making her the only non-Japanese national to do so.

In 2015, on an occasion to commemorate the 20th death anniversary of the singer, Nikkei Asia contributor Akira Tada wrote, "Asia has undergone significant changes in the past 20 years, with the flow of people, goods, and information having increased considerably. At the same time, new political frictions have developed. Teng, who continues to be loved across national and ethnic boundaries, still shines as a voice uniting Asia through song." In 2018, The Guardian wrote, "In 20th-century pop music, the voice of Elvis Presley is as iconic and identifiable in the west as that of Teresa Teng is in the east." Andrew N. Weintraub and Bart Barendregt described her as "a model of inter-Asian modernity whose voice crossed linguistic, national and generational borders," whereas John F. Copper called her "the most heard singer in the world ever" during her time.

Achievements and honors 

Considered a "brilliant linguist" by The New York Times, Teng was named one of the world's seven greatest female singers by Time magazine in 1986. In a national survey by NHK in 1997, her song "Toki no Nagare ni Mi o Makase" was voted 16th among the 100 greatest Japanese songs of all time and "The Moon Represents My Heart" stood first in the 10 best Chinese songs of all time in a poll by Radio Hong Kong in 1999. In 2009, to celebrate the 60th anniversary of the People's Republic of China, a government web portal conducted an online poll to choose "The Most Influential Cultural Figure in China since 1949". Over 24 million people voted, and Teng came out as the winner with 8.5 million votes. On the eve of the "March 8th International Women's Day" in 2010, she was voted "the most influential woman in modern China" by Chinese-language newspapers and radio stations in and outside China. The same year, CNN listed her among the 20 most influential music artists of the past 50 years. In 2011, her song "The Moon Represents My Heart" topped the online survey to celebrate the 100th anniversary of the founding of the Republic of China. In 2012, Commonwealth Magazine ranked her 19th on the list of the 50 most influential people in Taiwan in the last 400 years, making her the highest-ranked performer on the list. 

The 1996 Hong Kong film Comrades: Almost a Love Story, directed by Peter Chan, features the tragedy and legacy of Teng in a subplot to the main story. The movie won best picture in Hong Kong, Taiwan, and at the Seattle Film Festival in the United States. In 2007, TV Asahi produced a drama series entitled Teresa Teng Monogatari to commemorate the 13th anniversary of her death. Actress Yoshino Kimura starred as Teng.

In 2002, Teng's commemorative statue were erected in Fushou Garden, Qingpu District, Shanghai.

In 2015, a temple in Changhua County, Taiwan, erected a statue of the singer, honoring her as "Miaoyun Bodhisattva." 

The same year, the Daming County government in Handan City, Hebei province, China, built a "Lijun Town" dedicated to her. It renovated Teng's ancestral home to its original appearance. Teng's singing can be heard in every corner of the town. The city also features the "Teresa Teng Hanging Garden" and the "Teresa Teng Art Center", including a statue of the singer. Visitors can enjoy her music through artificial intelligence technology.

On January 29, 2018, a Google Doodle was released across Japan, China, Taiwan, Thailand, Malaysia, Singapore, Indonesia, India, Philippines, Australia, New Zealand, Sweden, Bulgaria, and Iceland to honor the singer on what would be her 65th birthday.

To date, Teng's stamps have been issued by several countries across the world, including Papua New Guinea, Timor, Argentina, Tuva Republic, Abkhazia, Grenada, Sakha Republic, Japan, Guinea-Bissau, North Korea, and Republic of Mali, in addition to Taiwan, Hong Kong, and mainland China.

Personal life

Like her maternal grandmother Mary Chang, Teng grew up Roman Catholic. As a child, she often spent her time playing around St. Joseph Catholic Church in Lujhou, at where she received baptism.

In 1971, Teng met her first boyfriend, Lin Zhenfa, a Malaysian paper tycoon, and they soon fell in love. A few years later, Lin died of a heart attack. Later, Teng, accompanied by her close friends, went to the cemetery to pay homage to her boyfriend, who had just died.

In 1980, while in the USA, Teng met Jackie Chan, who was filming in Hollywood. However, due to their personality differences, their romance was short-lived and they parted ways.

In 1982, Teng was engaged to Beau Kuok, a Malaysian businessman and the son of multi-billionaire Robert Kuok. However, Beau’s grandmother imposed several conditions on their union, including that Teng cease her career as an entertainer as well as fully disclose her biography and all her past relationships in writing. But Teng turned down the proposal, and the marriage was called off.

In 1990, Teng met French photographer Paul Quilery in France. They dated for five years and got engaged a month before Teng's passing on May 8, 1995.

Discography

Awards
Teng received the following selected awards:

Japan:
 1974: 16th Japan Record Awards: New Artist Award for "Kūkō"
 Japan Cable Awards: Grand Prix for "Tsugunai" in 1984: "Aijin" in 1985; and "Toki no Nagare ni Mi o Makase" (時の流れに身をまかせ) in 1986. Teng's fourth Grand Prix for "Walare no Yokan" in 1988 was only for the All Japan Wired Cable Awards' year first-half award show (上半期)
 1986: 28th Japan Record Awards: Gold Award for "Toki no Nagare ni Mi o Makase".
 1987: Japan Cable Awards: The Outstanding Star Award for "Wakare no Yokan"
 1987, 1988: The Cable Radio Music Award for "Wakare no Yokan".
 1995: The Cable Radio Special Merit Award for three consecutive Grand Prix wins.

Taiwan:
 1980: 15th Golden Bell Awards: Best Female Singer

Hong Kong
 1978: RTHK Top 10 Gold Songs Awards for "Siu Cyun Zi Lyun"
 1995: Golden Needle Award (posthumously)

References

External links

 Teresa Teng Foundation 鄧麗君文教基金會
 
 
 

 
1953 births
1995 deaths
Taiwanese Buddhists
Cantopop singers
Contraltos
Converts to Buddhism from Christianity
Converts to Buddhism from Roman Catholicism
Deaths from asthma
English-language singers from Taiwan
Former Roman Catholics
Mandarin-language singers
Cantonese-language singers of Taiwan
Japanese-language singers of Taiwan
Taiwanese Hokkien pop singers
Indonesian-language singers
People from Yunlin County
Taiwanese film actresses
Taiwanese Mandopop singers
Taiwanese television actresses
20th-century Taiwanese actresses
20th-century Taiwanese women singers
Taiwanese expatriates in Hong Kong